The Museum for Architectural Drawing is a private museum in Berlin, Germany run by the Tchoban Foundation. It was opened in June 2013. Three to four exhibitions are shown each year, made up of drawings from the Tchoban Foundation’s collection and from works on loan in cooperation with other museums and institutions.

Organising body 
The Tchoban Foundation, a private trust based in Berlin, runs the museum to promote architectural drawing by hand. It was founded by the architect Sergei Tchoban in 2009. Its aim is to foster the drawing skills of talented young architects and to make the founder’s collection accessible for study. Exhibitions of drawings are presented on site as well as in other museums worldwide. Together with the founder, Dr. h. c. Kristin Feireiss and Dr. Eva-Maria Barkhofen form the curatorship.

Collection 
Sergei Tchoban’s collection began with the purchase of a drawing by Pietro di Gottardo Gonzaga. Since then it has grown to consist of more than one hundred sheets dating from different periods from the 16th century to today. 
The trust meanwhile owns more than one hundred drawings by international architects from the 20th and 21st century as well as works by Tchoban himself.

Building 
Designed by the Moscow office SPEECH Tchoban & Kuznetsov, the Museum for Architectural Drawing, completed in 2013, is a four-storey solid corpus with a glass floor stacked on top. The profile of the four floors is reminiscent of casually piled up blocks. Its closed surface is detailed with strong magnified fragments of architectonic sketches in relief form. The line drawings (original drawings by Pietro Gonzaga and Angelo Toselli were used) and the colour of the cast concrete refer to the purpose of the building as a place for exhibiting architectural drawings. The museum shop and library are on the ground floor. Cabinets have been created on the first and second floor for temporary exhibitions. The museum depository is on the third floor. Windows have been avoided on these three floors to provide optimal conditions for the conservation of drawings. The Trust’s office is situated on the glazed top floor.  200 of the 450 available square metres, including the ticket desk and library, are used for exhibition space.

Exhibitions (selection) 
Architectural Worlds. Sergei Tchoban – Draftsman and Collector. DAM German Architecture Museum, Frankfurt am Main. 2010
The Golden Age of Architectural Graphics. Drawings of European Masters from the Collection of the Architect Sergei Tchoban. The Pushkin State Museum of Fine Arts, Moscow. 2010
Library of Architecture: Architectural Drawings from the State Hermitage Museum Collection and the Tchoban Collection. The State Hermitage Museum, Saint Petersburg. 2012
Piranesi’s Paestum. Master Drawings Uncovered. An Exhibition from the collection of the Sir John Soane's Museum, London in the Museum for Architectural Drawing, Berlin, 2013
Architecture in Cultural Strife. Russian and Soviet Architecture in Drawings. 1900–1953. Museum for Architectural Drawing, Berlin. 2013–2014
Lebbeus Woods. ON-LINE. Museum for Architectural Drawing, Berlin. 2014
LʼHôtel Particulier à Paris. An Exhibition from the collection of the École nationale supérieure des beaux-arts de Paris in the Museum for Architectural Drawing, Berlin. 2014–15
Alexander Brodsky – Works. Museum for Architectural Drawing, Berlin. 2015
Treasury, Legacy. A Museum for Architectural Drawing. Hartell Gallery + Bibliowicz Gallery, Cornell University, New York. 2015
Architectural Master Drawings from the Albertina. An Exhibition from the collection of the Albertina, Vienna in the Museum for Architectural Drawing, Berlin. 2016
Solo Italia. An Exhibition from the Tchoban Foundation, Istituto Centrale per la Grafica in Rome and the State Tretyakov Gallery in Moscow in the Museo dell’Istituto Centrale per la Grafica, Rome. 2016
Anime Architecture. Museum for Architectural Drawing, Berlin. 2016
Peter Cook. Retrospective. Museum for Architectural Drawing, Berlin. 2016–15
Berlin Projects. Architectural Drawings 1920–1990. Exhibition from the collection of the Deutsches Architekturmuseum, Frankfurt am Main, in the Museum for Architectural Drawing, Berlin. 2017
Drawing Ambience. Alvin Boyarsky and the Architectural Association. Museum for Architectural Drawing, Berlin. 2017
Architecture de l’avant-garde russe. Dessins de la collection Serguei Tchoban. Cabinet des dessins Jean Bonna, École des Beaux-Arts, Paris, 2017
Hans Poelzig. Projects for Berlin. Exhibition from the collection of the Architekturmuseum der Technischen Universität Berlin in the Museum for Architectural Drawing, Berlin. 2018
SIZA – Unseen & Unknown. Museum for Architectural Drawing, Berlin. 2019
In the Making: Ilya & Emilia Kabakov. Von Zeichnung zu Installation. Museum for Architectural Drawing, Berlin. 2019
Jean-François Thomas de Thomon: Drawings for Saint Petersburg from the collection of the Art Library – Berlin State Museums. Exhibition from the collection of the Kunstbibliothek – Staatliche Museen zu Berlin in the Museum for Architectural Drawing, Berlin. 2020
Thom Mayne: SculpturalDrawings. Museum for Architectural Drawing, Berlin. 2020
James Wines and SITE: Retrospective 1970–2020. Museum for Architectural Drawing, Berlin. 2020
Mark Fisher: Drawing Entertainment. Museum for Architectural Drawing, Berlin. 2021
Stalin’s Architect: The Rise and Fall of Boris Iofan. Museum for Architectural Drawing, Berlin. 2022

References

External links

 

Museums in Berlin
Architecture museums in Germany
Buildings and structures in Mitte
Museums established in 2013